Klinga is a surname. Notable people with the surname include:

Elin Klinga (born 1969), Swedish actress
Hans Klinga (born 1949), Swedish actor and film director
László Klinga (born 1947), Hungarian sport wrestler
Lisa Klinga (born 1991), Swedish footballer
Matti Klinga (born 1994), Finnish footballer
Ville Klinga (born 1968), Finnish television presenter